Sir William Lambert Dobson  (24 April 1833 – 17 March 1898) was an English-born Australian  politician, a Leader of the Opposition and Chief Justice of Tasmania, (Australia).

Early life
Dobson was born at Carr Hill, 
Gateshead, Durham, England, the elder son of John Dobson, a solicitor at Gateshead, and his first wife Mary Ann, née Atkinson (1811–1837). 
William was full brother to Frank and half-brother to Alfred and Henry Dobson.

William arrived in Van Diemen's Land (now Tasmania) with his parents on 16 July 1834. He was educated at Christ College and The Hutchins School at Hobart. After leaving school Dobson spent 18 months in the public service, returned to England, and entered at the Middle Temple. At the Inns of Court examination held in June 1856 Dobson took first place and was admitted to the bar on 6 June 1856.

Career
Dobson returned to Tasmania at the end of 1856 and was admitted to practise as a barrister on 22 January 1857. In 1859 Dobson was appointed crown solicitor. Dobson was elected a member of the house of assembly for Hobart, was Solicitor-General in 1860 and on 6 February 1861 became Attorney-General in the second William Weston ministry. Dobson continued in this position when the ministry was reconstituted under Thomas Chapman, and remained in office until January 1863. Dobson represented Campbell Town 1864-70. When James Whyte became premier, Dobson was elected leader of the opposition, on 24 November 1866 became attorney-general again under Sir Richard Dry, holding the same position in the succeeding James Wilson ministry (after Dry's death) from 4 August 1869 to 5 February 1870. Dobson was then appointed a puisne judge in the Supreme Court of Tasmania, at just 36 years of age. In 1884 he was acting chief justice, and on 2 February 1885 became chief justice. He held this position until his death on 17 March 1898. Dobson acted as deputy-governor in 1884, 1886–87 and 1892-93.

Legacy
Dobson was chancellor of the University of Tasmania, president of the leading sporting bodies, vice-president of the Royal Society of Tasmania and the Art Society of Tasmania, and trustee of the Tasmanian museum, art gallery and botanical gardens. On 17 March 1859 Dobson married Fanny Louisa Browne (died 1935), daughter of Rev. William Henry Browne the archdeacon of Launceston, who survived him with a son and three daughters. Dobson was knighted in 1886 by Queen Victoria on a visit to London and appointed K.C.M.G. in 1897.

Dobson was a member of the Linnean Society, and much interested in botany and higher education generally. As a member of parliament he brought in the act which made education compulsory, and he was also responsible for the act abolishing imprisonment for debt. Although not giving the impression of being a brilliant lawyer, he was an exceedingly sound one; it has been stated that during his judicial career he never had a decision reversed by a higher court.

Brothers
One of Dobson's brothers Henry (1841 – 1918) was a premier of Tasmania. Another brother, Frank (1835–95) was a Solicitor-General of Victoria from 1881 to 1883, while a third brother, Alfred (1848–1908), was Attorney-General in the first Philip Fysh ministry from 1877 to 1878, leader of the opposition 1883 to 1884, and speaker of the house from July 1885 to 1887.

References

 

1833 births
1898 deaths
Chief Justices of Tasmania
Judges of the Supreme Court of Tasmania
19th-century Australian judges
Members of the Tasmanian House of Assembly
Knights Commander of the Order of St Michael and St George
Solicitors-General of Tasmania
Attorneys-General of Tasmania
Leaders of the Opposition in Tasmania
Fellows of the Linnean Society of London
Colony of Tasmania judges